Fono is an island in the Federated States of Micronesia. The island has one church, St. Ignatius Loyola Church and approximately 400 residents.

References

Chuuk State
Islands of the Federated States of Micronesia